The Guadu Grande is a small coastal stream in the department of Haute-Corse, Corsica, France.
It enters the Mediterranean Sea from the west of the Cap Corse peninsula.

Course

It rises to the north of the  Monte Stello in the west of the commune of Brando.
It flows in a generally northwest direction past the villages of Olcani and Ogliastro, then turns to the southwest and enters the sea at the north end of the beach of the Marine d'Albo.
The last section of its course flows through a wetland,
The Torra d'Albu stands at the south end of the beach.
The D233 road follows the lower course of the river.

The lower part of the river valley and the Marine d'Albo have been designated a Zone naturelle d'intérêt écologique, faunistique et floristique (ZNIEFF) covering .
It includes the dunes and beach, the estuary, the river and the river banks.
There is extensive grazing in the wetland downstream.
The sides of the valley at the Marine d'Albo have been modified to allow walking near a parking area for motor homes, and a camping area is planned just upstream of the ZNIEFF, but there does not seem to be a large number of visitors.

Tributaries

The following streams (ruisseaux) are tributaries of the Guadu Grande (ordered by length):
 Cetro: 
 Alberghi: 
 San Giuvanni: 
 Cocolo: 
 Immola: 
 Terre Rosse: 
 Olmu: 
 Piedicanale:

Notes

Sources

Rivers of Haute-Corse
Rivers of France
Coastal basins of the Mediterranean Sea in Corsica